Emidio Pesce (born 16 March 2002) is an Italian racing driver currently racing in the Italian GT Championship with Antonelli Motorsport. He previously competed in the Formula Regional European Championship.

Career

Formula 4
Pesce's first season in single seaters was in 2019 where he competed in the Italian and Spanish F4 seasons with Jenzer. His first round of the season was at Circuit Paul Ricard in the Spanish F4 season where he finished 9th and 11th respectively and retiring in the 3rd race. He only raced one more time in the Spanish series in Barcelona where he scored his only point, Pesce finished the season 19th.

Pesce raced the whole Italian F4 season, where he didn't pick up any points with his highest finish of 14th coming at Monza.

Formula Regional European Championship 
Pesce moved up to the Formula Regional European Championship for the 2020 season, with DR Formula RP Motorsport, completing the full season. He scored 50 points in 22 starts and finished 12th in the championship.

2021 
Pesce stayed in the championship with the same team for the 2021 season. The Italian didn't manage to score any points, finishing 37th and last of all full-time drivers.

Racing record

Career summary

* Season still in progress.

Complete Italian F4 Championship results 
(key) (Races in bold indicate pole position) (Races in italics indicate fastest lap)

Complete Formula Regional European Championship results 
(key) (Races in bold indicate pole position) (Races in italics indicate fastest lap)

† Driver did not finish the race, but was classified, as they completed more than 90% of the race distance.

References

External links
 

2002 births
Living people
Italian racing drivers
Spanish F4 Championship drivers
People from Marino, Lazio
Italian F4 Championship drivers
Formula Regional European Championship drivers
Sportspeople from the Metropolitan City of Rome Capital
Jenzer Motorsport drivers
RP Motorsport drivers